Bossiaea alpina is a species of flowering plant in the family Fabaceae and is endemic to a small area in south-eastern Victoria, Australia. It is a diffuse shrub with oblong to elliptic leaves and bright yellow flowers arranged singly on the ends of branchlets.

Description
Flowering occurs from December to January.

Taxonomy and naming
Bossiaea alpina was first formally described in 2012 by Ian R. Thompson in the journal Muelleria from specimens collected by David Albert Albrecht near Surveyors Creek Camp in 1992. The specific epithet (alpina) refers to the species' alpine and subalpine habitats.

Distribution and habitat
This bossiaea grows in alpine and subalpine heath and woodland in the southern alps of Victoria, including on Lake Mountain, Mount Buller and in the Howill Plains area.

References

alpina
Flora of Victoria (Australia)
Plants described in 2012